

210001–210100 

|-id=030
| 210030 Taoyuan ||  || Taoyuan City, the gateway to Taiwan because of its demographic diversity and Taoyuan International Airport. || 
|-id=032
| 210032 Enricocastellani || 2006 OC || Enrico Castellani (born 1930) is an Italian painter, considered one of the most important figures of mid-twentieth century European art. His works are among the most sought after and expensive of the period. || 
|-id=035
| 210035 Jungli ||  || Zhongli District, located in the Taoyuan City, in the north-western part of Taiwan. || 
|}

210101–210200 

|-id=107
| 210107 Pistoletto ||  || Michelangelo Pistoletto (born 1933) is an Italian painter and sculptor, and a significant representative of the Italian trend of the Arte Povera. || 
|-id=147
| 210147 Zalgiris ||  || The Battle of Zalgiris (Grunwald or Battle of Tannenberg) took place in 1410 with the Grand Duchy of Lithuania and the Kingdom of Poland raging against the Knights of the Teutonic Order. || 
|-id=174
| 210174 Vossenkuhl || 2006 US || Wilhelm Vossenkuhl (born 1945), German philosopher known for his TV-discussions with astronomer Harald Lesch || 
|-id=182
| 210182 Mazzini ||  || Giuseppe Mazzini (1805–1872), nicknamed "Soul of Italy", Italian activist for the unification of Italy. || 
|}

210201–210300 

|-id=210
| 210210 Songjian ||  || Song Jian (born 1931), an academician of the Chinese Academy of Sciences and an academician of Chinese Academy of Engineering || 
|-id=213
| 210213 Hasler-Gloor ||  || Niklaus Gloor (born 1940) and his wife Ursula Hasler–Gloor (born 1940), two Swiss amateur astronomers and founders of the Astronomical Society of Winterthur in Switzerland || 
|-id=230
| 210230 Linyuanpei ||  || Lin Yuanpei (born 1936), an academician of the Chinese Academy of Engineering || 
|-id=231
| 210231 Wangdemin ||  || Wang Demin (born 1937), an academician of the Chinese Academy of Engineering, is the founder of Separate Zone Production Technology and Chemical Flooding Technology in China. || 
|-id=232
| 210232 Zhangjinqiu ||  || Zhang Jinqiu (born 1936), an architect and an academician of the Chinese Academy of Engineering || 
|-id=245
| 210245 Castets ||  || Martine Castets (born 1949), a French amateur astronomer || 
|-id=271
| 210271 Samarkand ||  || Samarkand, the ancient city in Uzbekistan which is most noted for its central position on the Silk Road. || 
|-id=290
| 210290 Borsellino ||  || Paolo Borsellino (1940–1992) was an Italian magistrate who played a very active role against organized crime. || 
|-id=292
| 210292 Mayongsheng ||  || Ma Yongsheng (born 1961), an academician of the Chinese Academy of Engineering, is the founder of the Deep Buried Marine Carbonate Gas Reservoir Model, and the first to discover the Puguang gas field and Yuanba gas field in China. || 
|}

210301–210400 

|-id=345
| 210345 Barbon || 2007 UQ || Roberto Barbon (born 1938) is an Italian astronomer at the Asiago Astrophysical Observatory and a senior scholar at UNIPD, as well as a member of the International Astronomical Union and its "Division J Galaxies and Cosmology". His research includes supernovae and open clusters (Src). || 
|-id=350
| 210350 Mariolisa ||  || Mario (born 2005) and Lisa (born 2002), the children of the Italian discoverer Fabrizio Tozzi || 
|}

210401–210500 

|-id=414
| 210414 Gebartolomei ||  || Geronimo Bartolomei (born 1972), student of physics at the University of Pisa and is working at the Astronomical Observatory of San Marcello. || 
|-id=421
| 210421 Freundtamás ||  || Hungarian neurobiologist Tamás Freund (born 1959) has been involved for over 30 years in functional anatomical studies on cortical microcircuits, employing combinations of immunocytochemistry, electron microscopy, and electrophysiology. He is an active science communicator. || 
|-id=425
| 210425 Imogene ||  || Imogene Powers Johnson (born 1930), a naturalist and amateur astronomer. || 
|-id=432
| 210432 Dietmarhopp ||  || Dietmar Hopp (born 1940), German entrepreneur and founder of the non-profit Dietmar Hopp Stiftung || 
|-id=433
| 210433 Ullithiele ||  || Ulrich Thiele (born 1952), head of Calar Alto Observatory in 1988. || 
|-id=434
| 210434 Fungyuancheng ||  || Yuan-Cheng Fung (1919–), known as the Father of Modern Biomechanics, is the author of the famous Fung's Law. || 
|-id=444
| 210444 Frithjof || 2009 BX || Frithjof Brauer (born 1980), developed in his Ph.D. thesis the principles of dust coagulation and formation of planets beyond the meter size barrier. || 
|}

210501–210600 

|-id=532
| 210532 Grantmckee ||  || Grant McKee (1992–2013), one of the 19 elite Prescott's Granite Mountain Hotshot firefighters who lost their lives battling a blaze on a ridge in Yarnell, Arizona, United States || 
|-id=533
| 210533 Seanmisner ||  || Sean Misner (1987–2013), one of the 19 elite Prescott's Granite Mountain Hotshot firefighters who lost their lives battling a blaze on a ridge in Yarnell, Arizona, United States || 
|}

210601–210700 

|-id=686
| 210686 Scottnorris ||  || Scott Norris (1985–2013), one of the 19 elite Prescott's Granite Mountain Hotshot firefighters who lost their lives battling a blaze on a ridge in Yarnell, Arizona, United States || 
|}

210701–210800 

|-bgcolor=#f2f2f2
| colspan=4 align=center | 
|}

210801–210900 

|-bgcolor=#f2f2f2
| colspan=4 align=center | 
|}

210901–211000 

|-id=939
| 210939 Bödök ||  || Zsigmond Bödök (1957–2010), Slovakian astronomer || 
|-id=983
| 210983 Wadeparker ||  || Wade Parker (1991–2013), one of the 19 elite Prescott's Granite Mountain Hotshot firefighters who lost their lives battling a blaze on a ridge in Yarnell, Arizona, United States || 
|-id=997
| 210997 Guenat ||  || François Guenat (born 1937), the first curator of the Jura natural science museum in Porrentruy, Switzerland || 
|}

References 

210001-211000